Patrick Joseph Moran (February 7, 1876 – March 7, 1924) was an American professional baseball player and manager. He was a catcher in Major League Baseball from 1901 to 1914. The year after his retirement, he became a manager,  and he led two teams to their first-ever modern-era National League championships: the 1915 Philadelphia Phillies and the 1919 Cincinnati Reds. Moran was the first manager to win National League pennants with two different teams. Moran's 1919 Reds also captured their first World Series championship.

Playing career
A native of Fitchburg, Massachusetts, Moran played 819 games over 14 National League seasons for the Boston Beaneaters (1901–05), Chicago Cubs (1906–09) and Phillies (1910–14). A right-handed hitter, he batted .235 with 18 home runs and 262 RBI. In , he finished tied for second in the league in home runs with seven.  After  he did not appear in more than 100 games in a season. However, as a second-string catcher, Moran became a student of the game and especially of pitching. In 1913–1914, he was a player-coach and, guided by his support and counsel, Phillies right-hander Grover Cleveland Alexander developed into one of the greatest pitchers of all time.

Philadelphia Phillies' manager
Moran retired as a player after the  season, and was immediately promoted to manager of the Phillies. The club had finished sixth in 1914 and was plagued by defections (and threatened defections) to the outlaw Federal League. Moran swung some astute trades, acquiring key players Dave Bancroft (a Baseball Hall of Famer like Alexander), Bert Niehoff and Milt Stock. Then—led by Alexander's 31 wins and the slugging of right fielder Gavvy Cravath—the Phils improved by 17 games and won their first NL pennant. In the 1915 World Series, they were defeated four games to one by the Boston Red Sox.

Cincinnati Reds' manager
Moran was not unemployed for long, however.  Cincinnati Reds manager Christy Mathewson, the former pitching great, had been stricken with tuberculosis from exposure to poison gas during military maneuvers.  When it was apparent that Mathewson was too sick to return for the  season, Moran was named his successor.  The Reds had finished third,  games behind, in 1918. Under Moran, they won 96 of 140 games in an abbreviated 1919 schedule to take the flag by nine games.  They then defeated the Chicago White Sox in the 1919 World Series five games to three to win Cincinnati's first undisputed world championship, although it would later be marred by the Black Sox scandal.

This should have been Moran's crowning accomplishment. But when it was charged that seven key members of the White Sox had conspired with gamblers to "throw" the series—the infamous Black Sox Scandal—the Reds' achievement was somehow tarnished. (The seven White Sox players were acquitted in a controversial 1920 trial but were nonetheless expelled from baseball.) In the wake of the scandal, Moran, his players and many baseball experts furiously asserted that Cincinnati would have won the series under any circumstances.

Moran remained at the helm in Cincinnati during the early 1920s. Apart from a poor  campaign, the Reds fielded contending ballclubs but did not return to the World Series. While spending the winter of 1923–24 at his Fitchburg home, Moran was taken ill. He was able to report to the Reds' training camp in Orlando, Florida, but his condition worsened and he died there at the age of 48. The cause of death was listed as Bright's Disease, a kidney ailment, but some baseball historians ascribe Moran's fatal illness to alcoholism.

Moran won 748 games and lost 586 (.561) as a National League manager over nine seasons, and he has the most wins for any manager in a nine season span. He won six and lost seven World Series games. The Hardball Times wrote that Moran "might be the most underrated manager in baseball history ... he managed only nine seasons before dying over 80 years ago. However, in that brief stretch Moran was clearly on pace for Cooperstown."

References

External links

Leavitt, Daniel R., Pat Moran, Society for American Baseball Research Biography Project
The Deadball Era

1876 births
1924 deaths
Baseball managers
Baseball players from Massachusetts
Boston Beaneaters players
Chicago Cubs players
Cincinnati Reds managers
Cortland (minor league baseball) players
Deaths from nephritis
Lyons (minor league baseball) players
Major League Baseball catchers
Montreal Royals players
Philadelphia Phillies coaches
Philadelphia Phillies managers
Philadelphia Phillies players
Sportspeople from Fitchburg, Massachusetts
World Series-winning managers